Lonchocarpus sanctuarii is a species of plant in the family Fabaceae. It is found only in Honduras, Mexico and San Salvador.

References

sanctuarii
Endemic flora of Honduras
Critically endangered flora of North America
Taxonomy articles created by Polbot